The Chancellors are fictional characters and a core family from the CBS Daytime soap opera, The Young and the Restless.

Since their introduction in 1973, the family has mainly been represented by Katherine Chancellor (Jeanne Cooper) and her feud with her husband Phillip II (Donnelly Rhodes)'s young mistress Jill Foster (Jess Walton). After years of feuding, Jill and Katherine form a bond and Kay becomes a mother figure to Jill, and a grandmother to Jill's sons. The family is currently represented by Jill, her son Billy Abbott (Jason Thompson), and his children and Katherine's own grandchildren Devon Hamilton (Bryton James) and Mackenzie Browning (Kelly Kruger).

Family members

First Generation
The history of the Chancellor family is deeply rooted in the history of Genoa City, which was founded by Civil War hero Garfield Dandridge Chancellor. In 1973 Garfield's great-great-grandson, Phillip Chancellor II, was running Chancellor Industries. He resided in the Chancellor mansion with his alcoholic and promiscuous wife Katherine (Kay). The two barely communicated with each other as husband and wife, and the lonely Phillip, driven to distraction by Katherine's obsessive behavior, sought refuge in the company of Katherine's young and beautiful paid companion, Jill Foster. Phillip and Jill fell in love, Jill was a virgin but became pregnant the one and only time they made love. Phillip obtained a divorce from Katherine in the Dominican Republic, but Katherine got her revenge by picking Phillip up from the airport on his return, and drove him off a cliff when he refused to give her another chance. Phillip married Jill on his deathbed in order to provide for her and their unborn child. However, Katherine later had Phillip's divorce from her invalidated, on the basis she was drunk when she signed the divorce papers, which automatically annulled Phillip and Jill's marriage. So Katherine was reinstated as Phillip's legal widow. Phillip's affair with Jill Foster produced a son, Phillip III. The stage was set for a long and bitter feud between the two women that would continue for decades. 
 Katherine Chancellor (Jeanne Cooper)  Born on October 25, 1928 as Katherine Shepherd, and known affectionately as Kay, Katherine marries high school and college sweetheart Gary Reynolds. Together they have one son, Brock. When Brock and Gary are out of the country, Katherine has an affair with Gary's golfing buddy, Arthur Hendricks and later gives birth to his son, Tucker, who she secretly gave up for adoption without even seeing him. After Gary's passing, Katherine marries Phillip Chancellor. However, Katherine and Phillip's unhappy marriage is upended by Jill Foster who gets pregnant with his child. The two women would fight over everything from men to children for the next four decades. Katherine was remarried in 2009 to Patrick Murphy. Katherine dies on August 1, 2013 at the age of 84.

Second Generation
 Brock Reynolds (Beau Kazer)  Brock is Katherine's son with her first husband, Gary Reynolds. When Brock is first introduced as a rebellious college aged kid, wasting his inheritance in Europe, with childhood friend, Lorie Brooks. After Gary's passing and Katherine's remarriage, Brock's rebellion started with wild sex and drugs. Brock comes in and out of his mother's life over the years. In 1974, Brock returned home a changed man and a minister. He also has a brief marriage to Jill Foster. Brock obtains a law degree while living in Paris. Brock has one child with former lover, Amanda Browning, Mackenzie who comes to Genoa City in 1999. Brock currently resides in New Orleans where he volunteers rebuilding homes for the victims of Hurricane Katrina. He is the chairman of the Chancellor Foundation, and also a singer.
 Tucker McCall (Stephen Nichols)  Tucker is Katherine's illegitimate son with Judge Arthur Hendricks given away at birth by a drunken Katherine. Former rock and roll manager, Tucker comes to Genoa City in 2009 and steals the company out from under his mother. Tucker immediately clashes with wealthy businessman and Katherine's close friend, Victor Newman. He marries Ashley Abbott, and after a brief coma is reunited with his illegitimate son, Devon, with former music groupie, Yolanda Hamilton. Devon and Tucker's relationship starts off rocky, but they eventually start to bond. Tucker also has a relationship with Jill and helps her find her biological family. Tucker and Katherine's relationship has many ups and downs, but they eventually reconcile before he relocates to Hong Kong in 2013. Tucker was with Katherine and Murphy when his mother passed.
 Phillip Chancellor III (Thom Bierdz)  Born on December 25, 1975, Phillip III is Phillip II's son with Jill Foster. Despite the feud between Jill and Katherine, Phillip bonds with both women. Phillip spends majority of his life in boarding schools. In 1986, the 16-year-old Phillip returns home when his mother gets shot. Katherine and Jill battle for his affections. Meanwhile, Phillip falls for Cricket Blair, but is seduced by the scheming Nina Webster and father's her son, Phillip IV. Phillip and Nina marry in 1989 and he dies from injuries sustained in a car accident a month later. However, in 2009, Phillip reveals that he faked his death to escape the pressure of living up to the Chancellor name. He also admits to being gay. Phillip currently lives in Australia.

Third Generation
 Mackenzie Browning Hellstrom (Kelly Kruger)  Born on December 30, 1983, Mackenzie is first introduced as homeless teenager staying at the Genoa City shelter where she meets Katherine. The runaway was eventually revealed to be Brock's daughter with Amanda Browning. Mackenzie, known affectionately as Mac falls for Billy Abbott, and they marry but the marriage is quickly annulled when the two are mistakenly led to believe they are cousins. Mac later falls for J.T. Hellstrom, during his marriage and they conceive a child which Mackenzie miscarries. Mackenzie stands in as the surrogate mother for Cane and Lily Ashby's twins. Mackenzie is the former owner of Crimson Lights, and Jimmy's Bar. Mackenzie and J.T. marry in November 2010 when they learn she is pregnant. The couple then relocates to Washington, D. C. where they give birth to son, Dylan "D.J." Hellstrom in 2011. When Katherine passes away, Mackenzie is unable to attend the funeral.
 Devon Hamilton (Bryton James)  Born on February 7, 1988, Devon is first introduced as a troubled teenager at the Genoa City Rec Center. Lily Winters and billionaire Victor Newman take a liking to Devon; Victor even considers adopting him. Instead, Devon is adopted by Neil and Drucilla, Lily's parents. Devon has trouble adjusting to being in a stable family unit, but when he finally does, Devon becomes very protective of his family. Between 2006 and 2007, Devon contracts meningitis and loses his hearing completely. He later gets a cochlear implant surgery. From 2007 to 2013, Devon has an enduring romance with Roxanne. In 2011, Devon is discovered to be Katherine and Judge Arthur Hendrick's grandson, and Tucker is his biological father. Though he initially wants nothing to do with Katherine and Tucker, the group eventually work through their differences and form relationships. He also reconnects with his estranged biological mother, Yolanda. Upon Katherine's passing, Devon inherits half of her estate. From 2013 to 2014, Devon falls in love with Hilary Curtis (Mishael Morgan), and they start an affair despite her marriage to Neil. They married in August 2015 and divorce in April 2017.
 Phillip "Chance" Chancellor IV (John Driscoll)  Born on March 15, 1988, Phillip Chancellor IV is the son of Phillip III and Nina Webster. In 2009, Phillip returns to Genoa City all grown up and reunites with his father first time since his presumed dead in 1989. Now known as Chance, Phillip IV struggles to accept his father while he falls for Chloe Abbott. Chance and Chloe become engaged but the relationship eventually ends. However, he later loses his virginity to Chloe. Chance also becomes involved with Heather Stevens. In 2010, Chance meets his half-brother, FBI Agent Ronan Malloy for the first time. In late 2010, Chance fakes his death with Ronan's help in order to bring down a crime ring. After revealing himself, Chance leaves town to start military intelligence training at The Pentagon.

Fourth Generation
 Dylan "D.J." Hellstrom  Born on June 21, 2011, in Washington, D.C., Dylan is the son of J.T. and Mackenzie Hellstrom. Mackenzie learns she is pregnant in late 2010. She and J.T. marry and later leave town.
 Becca Hellstrom  Becca is the daughter of J.T. and Mackenzie Hellstrom.
 Dominic Phillip Abbott Newman Winters Chancellor Dominic is the son of Chance Chancellor and Abby Newman. Chance was unable to have children, and Abby couldn't carry a child after her miscarriage years prior, so Devon Hamilton volunteered to be the sperm donor with Mariah Copeland being the surrogate.

In-Laws
 Jill Foster (Jess Walton) - Brock's wife (1975) and later Phillip II's wife. (1975)
 Derek Thurston (Joe Ladue) - Katherine's husband. (1977–81)
 Rex Sterling (Quinn Redeker) - Katherine's husband. (1988–90, 1992–94)
 Nina Webster (Tricia Cast) - Phillip's wife. (1989)
 Billy Abbott (Ryan Brown) - Mackenzie's husband. (2003)
 Patrick Murphy (Michael Fairman) Katherine's husband. (2009–13)
 Ashley Abbott (Eileen Davidson) - Tucker's wife. (2011–12)
 J.T. Hellstrom (Thad Luckinbill) - Mackenzie's husband. (2010–18)
 Hilary Curtis (Mishael Morgan) - Devon's wife. (2015–17, 2018)
 Abby Newman (Melissa Ordway) - Chance's wife. (2020–present)

Family tree
Legend

Chancellor Industries/ Chancellor-Winters

Chancellor Industries (CI) was a major design-and-engineering conglomerate, headquartered in Genoa City, Wisconsin.

Before his death, Phillip Chancellor II supervised all of the company's holdings, including the factory in Genoa City where Liz Foster worked. After Phillip's death, Katherine relied on good friend Victor Newman to keep an eye on things, and on Mitchell Sherman for legal advice. In later years Jill Foster Abbott, Neil Winters, and Cane Ashby all acted as CEO. For a brief period Katherine hired Jack Abbott as CEO. It was also the parent company of Jabot Cosmetics.

The company was referred to as a sleeping giant according to former CEO Jack Abbott, CI was "financially capable and always without scandal."

For a couple years CI was wholly owned subsidiary of Tucker McCall Unlimited when Katherine's long lost son, billionaire business mogul Tucker McCall assumed ownership via a hostile takeover. Tucker eventually sold Katherine majority ownership of CI under pressure from Victor Newman.

A couple of weeks after Katherine's funeral, on September 27, 2013, Victor Newman received a letter from Katherine leaving him Chancellor Industries. Her letter to him read: My Dear friend Victor, by the time you read this, you will have learned of my passing. I lived a long and colorful life and have no regrets about entering the next phase of my journey, save one. I wanted to ensure the longevity of my beloved Chancellor Industries. That is why I've decided to name you the sole owner of the company. I hope you will accept this gift in the loving spirit in which it was given. Love, Katherine. As the new majority shareholder and Chairman of Chancellor Industries, Victor immediately plans a merger between Chancellor and Newman Enterprises. The new company is titled Newman-Chancellor Industries.

Victor was having cash management issues due to some bad acquisitions, so it became necessary for him to sell Chancellor Industries. He gave Jill an exclusive opportunity before putting it on the market, acknowledging "If Katherine would want the company to go to anyone but me, I think it would be Jill." On February 2, 2015 Jill Foster Abbott bought Chancellor Industries from Victor Newman.

Currently Jill Foster Abbott Atkinson is the sole owner of Chancellor Industries. Cane Ashby is its CEO.  Katherine's grandson Devon Hamilton loaned Jill some of the money for the purchase initially because of a blackmail attempt by Jill's husband, and Cane's father Colin Atkinson. But later Devon gave the money of his own free will explaining "You know, Jill, Katherine gave me this money to do what I want with it, and what I want is for you and Cane to have the company. I really do. As long as Colin has nothing to do with it.

Chancellor divisions
 Chancellor Plant 
 Chancellor Tool & Die 
 Chancellor Construction
 Chancellor Entertainment Life
 Chancellor Communications

Chancellor subsidiaries
 Bio Link 
 Organic Life
 Northwestern Publishing

 Bonaventure Industries

Personnel

 Jill Abbott (Chairperson of the Board of Directors)
 Lily Winters (Co-CEO of Chancellor-Winters)
 Devon Hamilton (Co-CEO of Chancellor-Winters)
 Mitchell Sherman (General Counsel)
 Karen Fowler (Legal Department)

Former personnel
 Phillip Chancellor, Sr. (founder) 
 Phillip Chancellor II (owner, chairman and CEO) 
 Katherine Chancellor (owner, chairwoman and CEO) 
 Rex Sterling (former Executive)
 Jack Abbott (former CEO)
 Jill Foster Abbott (former CEO) 
 Neil Winters (former CEO) 
 Roger Wilkes (former Accountant)
 Tucker McCall (former minority Shareholder)
 Victor Newman (former Chairman of the Board)
 Victoria Newman (former Chief Executive Officer; Shareholder - Newman Enterprises)
 Nick Newman (former Shareholder - Newman Enterprises)
 Abby Newman (former Shareholder - Newman Enterprises)
 Cane Ashby (former CEO)
 Billy Abbott (former COO)
 Nate Hastings (former COO)

References

External links
 Soapcentral - Chancellor family

The Young and the Restless families
The Young and the Restless characters